Campus is a 2004 Tamil language teen film directed by Sharvi, who had previously directed the Malayalam film Gaandhiyan (1999). The film stars newcomers Sajith Raj, Nitesh, Divya Dwivedi and Sheetal Shah, with Sukanya, Anandaraj, Rajan P. Dev, Devan, Manobala, Babu Antony and Vijayan playing supporting roles. The film, produced by Peeran and Ariff, was released on 27 February 2004.

Plot

The storyline revolves around the campus of Model Arts College who had a good reputation in the past. Now, mob violence, eve teasing, vandalism and scantily dressed girls are the norm in the campus as inter-gang rivalry finds expression. Sathya (Sajith Raj) and Rockey (Nitesh) are the college leaders, they hate each other.

The college administrator R. K. Devaraj (Devan) and the corrupt minister Sathyaseelan (Rajan P. Dev) are planning to demolish the college. Sathyaseelan wants to build a powerhouse at that place and makes a profit, but the students have a different opinion and want to save the college. The professor Priya (Sukanya), with a couple of good students, tries to bring back a good reputation to the college. The college student Sheetal (Sheetal Shah) has even beaten a college record in an inter-college sports competition. The reputation of the college then has gradually changed, even Sajith Raj and Nitesh have become friends.

Thereafter, Sathyaseelan sends the police and the goons to kick out the students from the college. What transpires next forms the rest of the story.

Cast

Sajith Raj as Sathya
Nitesh as Rocky
Divya Dwivedi as Divya
Sheetal Shah as Sheetal
Sukanya as Priya
Anandaraj
Rajan P. Dev as Sathyaseelan
Devan as R. K. Devaraj 
Manobala as Nallathambi
Babu Antony as Sathya's brother
Vijayan
Sethu Vinayagam as B. Sreevallabhan
Laxmi Rattan as Raj Bhavan
Bayilvan Ranganathan
Madhan Bob as Professor
Muthukaalai as Adhiveeran Pulipandi
Vimalraj as Samy
Saju Kodiyan as Professor
Kottayam Nazeer as Attender
Maheer Khan
Kalairani as Student's mother
Bharathi as Student
Sujibala as Student
Cool Jayanth in a special appearance
Durga Shetty in a special appearance

Soundtrack

The film score and the soundtrack were composed by Rajneesh. The soundtrack, released in 2004, features 6 tracks with lyrics written by P. Vijay, Snehan, Kalaikumar and Viveka.

Reception
Sify said, "The film directed by  Sharvi is a fluffy entertainer with routine song and dance sequences with a wafer-thin plot that is predictable and targeted at the youth". Malini Mannath of Chennai Online opined that "It's Sharvi's (he's directed some Malayalam films) debut film in Tamil, and he would have done better to concentrate on his script, focusing on what exactly he wanted to convey".

Sajith Raj later signed on to play the lead role in Kalakkal, but the film eventually did not release.

References

2004 films
2000s Tamil-language films
Indian teen films
Indian coming-of-age films
Films set in universities and colleges
Films shot in South Korea